Roger McKenzie may refer to:
 Roger McKenzie is a musician.
Roger McKenzie (comics), comic book writer
Roger McKenzie (trade unionist), trade union activist